is a military air base of the Japan Air Self-Defense Force . It is home to the Kakamigahara Air and Space Museum.

Units 

 Air Defense Command
 Central Air Defense Force
 4th Air Defence Missile Group
 13th Fire Unit  
 15th Fire Unit  

 Air Development and Test Command
 Air Development and Test Wing
 Air Material Command
 2nd Air Deposit

operated aircraft 
Mitsubishi F-2
Mitsubishi XF-2
McDonald Douglas F-15
McDonald Douglas F-15j
Kawasaki C1
Kawasaki c-2
Kawasaki T-4
Fuji T-7

References

External links
 Gifu Air Base 

Airports in Japan
Transport in Gifu Prefecture
Japan Air Self-Defense Force bases
Buildings and structures in Gifu Prefecture
Kakamigahara, Gifu